Jacob D. Griffin (born November 16, 1998) is an American professional stock car racing driver who last competed part-time in the NASCAR Camping World Truck Series, driving the No. 34 Chevrolet Silverado for Reaume Brothers Racing. He has also raced in the ARCA Menards Series in the past. All of Griffin's starts in both series have come on dirt tracks and short tracks.

Racing career

Early years
Racing in his early years at a Quincy, Illinois track, Griffin earned the name "Fireball" and raced late models and modifieds.

NASCAR and ARCA
Griffin broke into the NASCAR Camping World Truck Series in 2015 with MB Motorsports. The deal came about through a mutual friendship between team owner Mike Mittler and Jake's father Danny Griffin, which was formed by working in NASCAR together in 2004. Griffin dropped out of the Kroger 200 with handling problems to finish 26th. Six races later, he crashed out of the race at Iowa Speedway to finish 27th. Attempting the Mudsummer Classic with Mike Affarano Motorsports, he failed to qualify after finishing fourth in the last chance qualifier. 

In 2016, Griffin ran at Iowa again with MB, finishing one lap down in 21st. He retired with engine problems at Gateway Motorsports Park, and signed on with Red Horse Racing to run at Eldora Speedway. Qualifying 11th by way of heat race, Griffin made up seven spots during the race to finish fourth. Also in 2016, Griffin dipped his toe into the ARCA Racing Series, making a single start in the No. 15 Toyota for Venturini Motorsports. Running the SuperChevyStores.com 100 at the Illinois State Fairgrounds Racetrack, he would qualify third and finish ninth in the race.

After not making any NASCAR and ARCA starts in both 2017 and 2018, Griffin returned to the Truck Series for the 2019 Eldora Dirt Derby, driving the No. 03 for Mike Affarano Motorsports for the second time.

Griffin did not make any NASCAR and ARCA starts in 2020, either. However, he did return to the Truck Series again in 2021, as it was announced in January of that year that he would be driving both of the series' new dirt races at Bristol and Knoxville for Reaume Brothers Racing.

Personal life
Griffin works closely with the organization People Against Distracted Driving after meeting the founder online.

Motorsports career results

NASCAR
(key) (Bold – Pole position awarded by qualifying time. Italics – Pole position earned by points standings or practice time. * – Most laps led.)

Camping World Truck Series

 Season still in progress
 Ineligible for series points

ARCA Racing Series
(key) (Bold – Pole position awarded by qualifying time. Italics – Pole position earned by points standings or practice time. * – Most laps led.)

References

External links
 

1998 births
Living people
People from Quincy, Illinois
NASCAR drivers
ARCA Menards Series drivers
Racing drivers from Illinois